The 1955 NCAA Men's Golf Championship was the 17th annual tournament to determine the national champions of NCAA men's collegiate golf. It was contested in June 1955 at the Holston Hills Country Club in Knoxville, Tennessee.

LSU won the team title and Joe Campbell from Purdue won the individual title.

Team competition

Leaderboard

References

NCAA Men's Golf Championship
Golf in Tennessee
NCAA Golf Championship
NCAA Golf Championship
NCAA Golf Championship
NCAA Golf Championship